Pop På Svenska & Plan 714 till Komeda is the re-issue of the first two releases by Swedish band Komeda.  Both were originally released by the Swedish record label North of No South — the album Pop På Svenska in 1993 and the EP Plan 714 till Komeda in 1995.  Both the album and EP are sung in Komeda's native language.

The title Plan 714 till Komeda is supposed to be a reference to the Hergé comic-strip album Vol 714 pour Sydney (Flight 714 to Sydney), the Swedish title of which is Plan 714 till Sydney.

The Minty Fresh label had given an international release to Komeda's prior two English language albums, so the label combined Pop På Svenska and Plan 714 till Komeda onto one CD and issued it in 2001.

Track listing
All songs written by Komeda

Pop På Svenska
 "Oj Vilket Liv!"
 "Bonjour Tristesse"
 "Sen Sommar"
 "Ad Fontes"
 "Vackra Kristaller"
 "Medicin"
 "Feeling Fine"
 "Vals På Skare"
 "Snurrig Bossanova"
 "Stjärna"
 "Glöd"
 "En Promenix"
 "Borgo"
 "Mod"

Plan 714 till Komeda
 "Fuego de la Vida"
 "Herbamore"
 "Som I Fjol"
 "En Spricka I Taket"

References

2001 albums
Komeda albums
Minty Fresh Records albums